Serpong Station (SRP) is a railway station located in Serpong, Serpong, South Tangerang, Banten. It is located not far from Bumi Serpong Damai complex or commonly known as BSD City. This station mostly served the commuter in Greater Jakarta.

In 1992, the station was electrified to support the Serpong Express KRL journey, which was touted as the forerunner of the Rangkasbitung Line of the KRL Commuterline system. This station was originally served as the terminus for the KRL Commuterline, but has now been extended to Rangkasbitung. Serpong Station is the westernmost train station in South Tangerang City.

Buidling and layout 
Initially, the station had three railway lines with line 2 being a straight line. On 4 July 2007, the new Serpong Station was inaugurated by President Susilo Bambang Yudhoyono as a pilot station, simultaneously with the inauguration of the double track at this station. In addition, the layout of this station has also changed, so that this station has four railroad lines with straight tracks on lines 2 and 3. The old station building, which was a legacy of the Staatsspoorwegen, has been torn down due to the impact of the construction of platforms and new buildings. Nevertheless, passenger activity at this station remains normal. With the completion of the Serpong–Parungpanjang double track as of 17 April 2013, line 2 is made a straight track towards , while line 3 is a straight track towards .

Services
The following is a list of train services at the Serpong Station.
KRL Commuterline
 Green Line, towards  (Serpong branch)

Intermodal support

Incidents 

 On 22 December 2019, The Serpong Station was hit by strong winds and caused the roof of the station flies, power outages and trees near the station toppled. As a result, KRL trips were delayed until the next day.

Gallery

References

External links

South Tangerang
Railway stations in Banten
Railway stations opened in 1889